The 2006 Parramatta Eels season was the 60th in the club's history. Coached by Brian Smith and Jason Taylor and captained by Nathan Cayless, they competed in the NRL's 2006 Telstra Premiership.

Summary
The Parramatta Eels began the 2006 season with the knowledge that their coach Brian Smith, would not be there next season, after being asked to step down by the management of the Parramatta Eels rugby league club in what turned out to be a direct trade with the Newcastle Knights club for their coach, Michael Hagan. However, Smith resigned officially on 15 May 2006, after an extremely poor start to the season, which left the Parramatta side running 14th and second-last. 

Assistant coach and former Parramatta player, Jason Taylor, took over as caretaker manager for the rest of the year and led a Parramatta resurgence in the second-half of the season to eventually reach eighth position by season's end including a nine-game winning streak. They were, however, eliminated by eventual runners-up Melbourne Storm in the first week of the finals, 6–12. Melbourne were later found guilty of wilful and deliberate breaches of the salary cap over a five year period between 2006-2010.

Standings

Players and staff
The current playing squad and coaching staff of the Parramatta Eels for the 2006 NRL season as of 21 September 2006.

Awards
The following awards were awarded in the post-season:
Michael Cronin Clubman of the Year Award: Chad Robinson
Ken Thornett Medal (Players' Player): Nathan Hindmarsh
Jack Gibson Award (Coach's Award): Nathan Cayless
Eric Grothe Rookie of the Year Award: Jarryd Hayne

References

Parramatta Eels seasons
Parramatta Eels season